This is a list of singles that have peaked in the Top 10 of the Billboard Hot 100 during 1982.

Paul McCartney, Hall & Oates, Olivia Newton-John, and Diana Ross each had three top-ten hits in 1982, tying them for the most top-ten hits during the year.

Top-ten singles

1981 peaks

1983 peaks

See also
 1982 in music
 List of Hot 100 number-one singles of 1982 (U.S.)
 Billboard Year-End Hot 100 singles of 1982

References

General sources

Joel Whitburn Presents the Billboard Hot 100 Charts: The Eighties
Additional information obtained can be verified within Billboard's online archive services and print editions of the magazine.

1982
United States Hot 100 Top 10